Nina Stahr (born 27 October 1982) is a German politician of the Alliance 90/The Greens party who has been serving as a member of the Bundestag since the 2021 elections, representing the Berlin-Steglitz-Zehlendorf district.

Political career
Stahr became a member of the Alliance 90/The Greens party in 2006. From 2016 to 2021, she served as co-chair of the Green Party in Berlin.

In 2020, Stahr wrote the book Die Krise ist weiblich.

In parliament, Stahr serves on the Committee for Education, Research and Technology Assessment and the Committee on Family Affairs, Senior Citizens, Women and Youth. In addition to her committee assignments, she is part of the German-British Parliamentary Friendship Group and the German-Irish Parliamentary Friendship Group.

Other activities 
 Stiftung Lesen, Member of the Board of Trustees (since 2022)

References

External links 
 

Living people
1982 births
Politicians from Frankfurt
21st-century German politicians
21st-century German women politicians
Members of the Bundestag for Alliance 90/The Greens
Members of the Bundestag 2021–2025
Female members of the Bundestag